Travis Vaughn Tidwell (February 5, 1929 – July 1, 2004) was an American football player and coach. Tidwell played high school football for Woodlawn High School. He played college football at Auburn University and then in the National Football League (NFL) with the New York Giants. He was MVP of the 1950 Senior Bowl. Tidwell led Auburn in defeating Alabama in 1949. Zipp Newman wrote "There has never been a sweeter Auburn victory in all the 58 years of football on the Plains than the Tigers 14–13 win over Alabama."

See also
 List of NCAA major college football yearly total offense leaders

References

External links
Just Sports Stats

1929 births
2004 deaths
American football quarterbacks
Auburn Tigers football coaches
Auburn Tigers football players
New York Giants players
Players of American football from Alabama
Sportspeople from Florence, Alabama